Jonathan Lardot (31 January 1984) is a Belgian football referee. He made his debut in the Belgian Pro League during the 2010–11 season. On 26 July 2013, he refereed the opening game of the 2013/14 season between Club Brugge and Charleroi.

References 

Belgian football referees
1984 births
Living people
UEFA Europa League referees